The  is a national expressway in the Chūgoku region of Japan. It is owned and operated by West Nippon Expressway Company.

Overview
The expressway is officially referred to as the Chūgoku-Ōdan Expressway Hiroshima Hamada Route. Together with the Chūgoku Expressway and Hiroshima Expressway, the expressway forms a link connecting the greater Hiroshima area with western Shimane Prefecture.

The first section of the expressway was opened to traffic in 1989 and the entire route was completed in 1991. The entire route is 2 lanes with the exception of the short (1.3 km) section between Hamada Junction and Hamada Interchange.

List of interchanges and features

 IC - interchange, SIC - smart interchange, JCT - junction, SA - service area, PA - parking area, BS - bus stop, TN - tunnel, BR - bridge

External links 
 West Nippon Expressway Company

Expressways in Japan